Mehmet Büyükekşi (born 10 May 1961) is a Turkish business man, architect and current president of the Turkish Football Federation. He was the president for Turkish Süper Lig football club Gaziantep. He served as a board member at Turkish Airlines. He is married and has three children.

References

External links 

1961 births
Living people
People from Gaziantep
Turkish architects
Turkish businesspeople
Turkish Football Federation presidents
Turkish sports executives and administrators